Summer Storm (French: Orage d'été) is a 1949 French-Italian drama film directed by Jean Gehret and starring Gaby Morlay, Odette Joyeux and Odile Versois. A separate Italian-language version was also released.

Cast
 Gaby Morlay as Mme. Arbelot 
 Odette Joyeux as Marie-Blanche 
 Peter Trent as Ralph 
 Antoine Balpêtré as M. Arbelot 
 Odile Versois as Marie-Lou 
 Marina Vlady as Marie-Tempête 
 Alain Feydeau
 Olga Baïdar-Poliakoff
 Laure Thierry as Marie-Aimée 
 Gilles Aillaud

References

Bibliography 
 Quinlan, David. The Film Lover's Companion: An A to Z Guide to 2,000 Stars and the Movies They Made. Carol Publishing Group, 1997.

External links 
 

1949 films
1949 drama films
Italian drama films
French drama films
1940s French-language films
Films directed by Jean Gehret
Pathé films
French black-and-white films
1940s French films
1940s Italian films